Gabtali is an upazila of the Bogra District, located in Bangladesh's Rajshahi Division. It is named after its administrative centre, the town of Gabtali and is best known as the home upazila of Ziaur Rahman, the late President of Bangladesh. Gabtali town is 7 km north of Bogra.

Etymology

There are numerous theories on how Gabtali got its name. According to Najmul Huda, the history of the naming of this place is unknown and possible theories are mere folklore.

In the Gabtali Fables by Mubarak Ali Akhand, he mentions an incident which took place in circa 1932 when he was 10–12 years old. It was the day of Eid and the Dakshinpara villagers, including Akhand, set off to offer prayers in the Madhyapara eidgah. In the middle of the village, to the left of the road, stood an enormous shaky Gaub tree. The local worshippers there informed them that the village was named after this Gaub tree. The area is known to have many Gaub trees, and historically in northwestern Gabtali, there were forests and dense vegetation which the locals called ‘Ara’. Gaub trees were abundant in the Ara forests, and were said to have been born naturally. In the early 1900s, large jute-laden boats (known as lao in the local dialect) drove from the low lands at the rear of Gabtali Sadar across many towns. The wood from the underside of the boat, known in Bengali as toli, could be found across the Gabtoli area. Many people found the underside wood digging the wells, and this wood continues to be found when the soil is dug. Some believe that this is probably also a factor as to why Gabtoli is an impoverished area.

Administrative area
This upazila has 1 municipality (Gabatli municipality), 12 unions, 104 mauzas and 211 villages, one police station (Gabatli Model Thana) and one police outpost (Bagbari). It falls under Bogra-7 parliamentary constituency.

History

Modern-day Gabtali Upazila was historically known as a stronghold for Muslim revivalist campaigns such as the 19th-century Tariqah-i-Muhammadiya movement and the early 20th-century Khilafat Movement. In 1914, Gabtali was established as a thana.

During the Bangladesh Liberation War of 1971, the Pakistan Army set up a military camp in Gabtali. On 15 November, a commander of the Bengali freedom fighters was killed during a brawl between the two sides in the village of Daripara in Balia Dighi Union. Civilians were also killed when the Pakistani army attempted to take control of Jaybhoga's Railway Bridge. The army retreated on 13 December, murdering two civilians on the way, leading to another brawl with freedom fighters killing a Pakistani soldier. The final encounter was when four soldiers were caught hiding behind bushes in Kshudraperi on 16 December. This encounter resulted in the deaths of all four soldiers and a freedom fighter.

In 1983, the Gabtali thana was upgraded to an upazila (sub-district).

Geography

It borders Shibganj Upazila to the north, Sonatala Upazila to the north and east, Sariakandi Upazila to the east, Dhunat Upazila to the south, and Shajahanpur and Bogra Sadar upazilas to the west.

Demographics

According to the 2011 Bangladesh census, Gabtali Upazila had 83,411 households and a population of 319,588, 6.7% of whom lived in urban areas. 9.8% of the population was under the age of 5. The literacy rate (age 7 and over) was 46.6%, compared to the national average of 51.8%.

Administration
Gabtali Upazila is divided into Gabtali Municipality and 12 union parishads: Balia Dighi, Dakshinpara, Durgahata, Gabtali, Kagail, Mahishaban, Naruamala, Nasipur, Nepaltali, Rameshwarpur, Sonarai and  Shunkhanpukur. The union parishads are subdivided into 103 mauzas and 211 villages.

Gabtali Municipality is subdivided into 9 wards and 21 mahallas.

Transport

Railway stations Gabtali and Sukanpukur are on the branch line connecting Santahar and Kaunia. In July 2014 they were served by six or eight intercity and six mail trains a day.

Education

There are nine colleges in the upazila. Gabtali Government College is the only public one. Private colleges include Durgahatta Degree College, Shahid Zia Degree College, Taranir Hat Degree College, and Taslim Uddin Tarafder Degree College. Syed Ahmmed College in Sukhan Pukur is the only honors level college in the upazila. The Jaguli B. L. High School was established in 1912.

The madrasa education system includes three fazil madrasas. The Darul Hadith Rahmaniyyah in Sondabari dates back to the early 1700s.

Economy and tourism
Out of Gabtali's 455 mosques, the historic mosque of Madar Shah Ghazi in Bagbari is quite notable. The area is quite notable for Hadudu, having historically being national champions in the Seventies. In Poradaha Battla, Golabari, Mahishaban, there is the annual historic Poradoho fish fair (mela).

Notable people
 Ziaur Rahman, President of Bangladesh (1977-1981), spent part of his childhood in Bagbari village.
 Tarique Rahman, politician; current acting chairman of Bangladesh Nationalist Party (BNP).
 Arafat Rahman, cause célèbre.

See also
 Upazilas of Bangladesh
 Districts of Bangladesh
 Divisions of Bangladesh

References

Upazilas of Bogra District